Cavour is an unincorporated community in Forest County, Wisconsin, United States.

Notable people
Neil McEachin, Wisconsin lawyer, judge, and politician, was born in Cavour.

References

Unincorporated communities in Forest County, Wisconsin
Unincorporated communities in Wisconsin